Donald "Don" Cameron (15 July 1887 – 25 August 1947) was a New Zealand rugby union player who played three test matches for the All Blacks in 1908, scoring one try.

He was educated at Stratford High School.

Career 
A goalkicker, Cameron represented Taranaki in the 1900s and in the 1910s, making his debut as a 19-year-old in 1906. Apart from playing his usual position of wing three-quarter, he also played as a centre, fullback and five-eighth while playing for Taranaki. He scored four tries in a 47–3 win against Manawatu in 1906.

His three appearances for the national side were against the touring Anglo-Welsh. He scored a try on debut, however he missed both of his conversation attempts in his final game.

Cameron was selected for the 1910 All Black team to play in Australia but withdrew and was replaced by Frank Wilson.

His father, R.H Cameron represented Taranaki in 1885.

References 

1887 births
1947 deaths
New Zealand rugby union players
New Zealand international rugby union players
People educated at Stratford High School, New Zealand
Rugby union players from Waitara, New Zealand
Taranaki rugby union players